Guardian Biotechnologies Inc. is a privately owned plant biotechnology company, founded in August 2002, that operates from its corporate headquarters in Saskatoon, Saskatchewan, Canada.

References

External links

Profile on NRC-Plant Biotechnology Institute's bulletin

Biotechnology companies of Canada
Companies based in Saskatoon
2002 establishments in Saskatchewan
Canadian companies established in 2002
Biotechnology companies established in 2002